Monster or Wen Shang-yi (born 28 November 1976, in Hsinchu County, Taiwan), is one of the two guitarists and leader of the Taiwanese rock band, Mayday. 
Monster became interested in music and the guitar while studying at the Affiliated Senior High School of National Taiwan Normal University where he also met three other Mayday members Ashin, Stone and Masa. He later became vice-president of the guitar society in high school and president of the Rock and Roll society at National Taiwan University during his university days.

An accomplished guitarist, he has also dabbled in album production, producing albums for Fish Leong, Della Ding, Alien Huang, Energy, Victor Wong, Jia Jia, Maggie Chiang, Fahrenheit, Jing Chang, Xiao Bing Chih and others. He also composed songs for many singers such as Jam Hsiao, Richie Jen and Stefanie Sun.

Monster was given his own Signature Model Les Paul from Gibson in 2014. He was added to the Gibson signature artist club as the second guitarist from Asia. Monster's admired guitarist is Matsumoto Takahiro, who are the leader and guitarist of the famous Japanese band B'z.

References

1976 births
Living people
Taiwanese people of Hakka descent
Taiwanese guitarists
People from Hsinchu
Taiwanese Mandopop singers
Taiwanese rock musicians
National Taiwan University alumni
Hakka musicians
Taiwanese idols
21st-century Taiwanese male singers
21st-century guitarists